The Ragwort Control Act 2003 (c 40) is an Act of the Parliament of the United Kingdom. It creates guidance as a Code of Practice on Ragwort Control, but does not force control, create a responsibility to control or make growing the plant a criminal offence. Common ragwort is considered an "injurious weed" that is harmful to the interests of agriculture.

Section 1 - Control of ragwort
This section inserts section 1A of the Weeds Act 1959 which enables the Minister (currently will be within DEFRA to make. advice in the form of a Code, approved by parliament, and reads in full:

"(1) The Minister may make a code of practice for the purpose of providing guidance on how to prevent the spread of ragwort (senecio jacobaea L.).
(2) Before making the code the Minister must consult such persons as he considers appropriate.
(3) The Minister must lay a copy of the code before Parliament.
(4) The Minister may revise the code; and subsections (2) and (3) apply to the revised code.
(5) The code is to be admissible in evidence.
(6) If the code appears to a court to be relevant to any question arising in proceedings it is to be taken into account in determining that question.”

The 2004 Code (with amendments) applies only to England  and is set out here with additional Guidance on Disposal  navigable here which was issued on 15 March 2011 followed by an addendum of 18 April 2012.

Section 2 - Wales
Section 2(1) provides that the reference to the Weeds Act 1959 in Schedule 1 to the National Assembly for Wales (Transfer of Functions) Order 1999 (SI 1999/672) is to be treated as referring to that Act as amended by the Ragwort Control Act 2003. Section 2(2) provides that this does not affect the power to make further Orders varying or omitting that reference.

Section 3 - Short title, commencement and extent
Section 3(2) provides that the Act came into force at the end of the period of three months that began on the date on which it was passed. The word "months" means calendar months. The day (that is to say, 20 November 2003) on which the Act was passed (that is to say, received royal assent) is included in the period of three months. This means that the Act came into force on 20 February 2004.

Controversy
Country Life questioned the effectiveness of this Act in 2006.

References

External links
The Ragwort Control Act 2003 as amended and as originally enacted
 (Withdrawn 2016)

United Kingdom Acts of Parliament 2003